Thalusia is a genus of beetles in the family Cerambycidae, containing the following species:

 Thalusia atrata (Melzer, 1918)
 Thalusia erythromera (Audinet-Serville, 1834)

References

Rhopalophorini